Gjögur Airport  is an airport serving the small population of the Árneshreppur district in the Westfjords of north-west Iceland, on the coast of Húnaflói bay.

Operations
It is staffed part-time by an AFIS controller, and only opens for Norlandair flights, which are twice a week in the winter and once a week in the summer. Gjögur airport is very important to the local population. In the winter, the airport is the only means of access to the entire district, as the access road is impassable. The government of Iceland requires these flights in order to supply the population with food and other goods, and provide passenger transport. Norlandair is the only airline that flies here.

The airport has runway lights, PAPI lights, and taxiway lights. It has an instrument approach using the on-field Gjogur non-directional beacon (Ident: GJ), but this is only short range, e.g. it can be picked up from nearby Hólmavík airfield.

Airlines and destinations

Statistics

Passengers and movements

See also 
 Transport in Iceland
 List of airports in Iceland

Notes

References

External links 
 OurAirports - Gjögur
 OpenStreetMap - Gjögur

Airports in Iceland